Church Hollow is a valley in the U.S. state of New York.

Church Hollow takes its name from the local Church family.

References

Landforms of Rensselaer County, New York
Valleys of New York (state)